Cali Timmins (born April 27, 1963) is a Canadian former actress, best known for her work in the soap Ryan's Hope as Maggie Shelby, a role she played from 1983 to 1989. She also had a leading role in the cult classic Spacehunter: Adventures in the Forbidden Zone as Nova.

She also played the first Paulina Cantrell Cory in Another World from 1990 to 1991.

She has done guest spots in a variety of TV shows, Frasier, Cybill, Highlander: The Series, and Forever Knight, amongst others.

Three of her siblings, Michael, Margo, and Peter, are in the Canadian country rock band Cowboy Junkies. Their grandfather, Noah Timmins, was the pioneering Canadian mining executive who gave his name to the city of Timmins, Ontario.

Filmography
 Hangin' In: "Pressure Point" (1981) as Susan
 Spacehunter: Adventures in the Forbidden Zone (1983 film) as Nova
 Loving Friends and Perfect Couples (1983)
 The Hotel New Hampshire (1984 film) as Bitty Tuck
 Ryan's Hope (1983–1988, 1989) as Maggie Shelby Greenberg Coleridge
 Katts and Dog (1988–1989) as Maggie Davenport
 Another World (1990–1991) as Paulina Cantrell Cory
 Secret Service: "It's in the Mail/Counterfeit Murder" (1992) as Tanya Peterson
 Street Legal (1993–1994) as Deborah Lowry
 Forever Knight: "1966" (1993) as Lili
 Kung Fu: The Legend Continues: "Reunion" (1993) as Valerie Mitchell
 Walker, Texas Ranger: "She'll Do to Ride the River With" (1993) as Ally Slade
 Highlander: The Series: "The Fighter" (1994) as Iris
 RoboCop: "Illusions" (1994) as Tish
 Due South: "Manhunt" (1994) as Julie
 Murder, She Wrote: "Film Flam" (1995) as Barbie Lippin
 Hard Evidence (1995 film) as Dina Davis
 Frasier: "The Show Where Diane Comes Back" (1996) as Mary Anne
 Cybill: "When You're Hot, You're Hot" (1996) as Rebecca
 The Takeover (1996 film) as Kathy
 Sealed with a Kiss (1996 film) as Christine Bellows
 Catch Me If You Can (1998 TV movie) as Kid's Mother
 Heaven's Fire (1999 TV movie) as Fiona Dahl
 The Pretender: "Rules of Engagement" (2000) as Rebecca Simons

References

External links
 
 Cali Timmins at TV Guide

1963 births
Living people
Actresses from Montreal
Canadian television actresses
Canadian film actresses
Canadian soap opera actresses
20th-century Canadian actresses
21st-century Canadian actresses